Dmitriyevka is a rural locality (a selo) and the administrative center of Dmitriyevskoye Rural Settlement, Yakovlevsky District, Belgorod Oblast, Russia. The population was 1,002 as of 2010. There are 10 streets.

Geography 
Dmitriyevka is located 15 km northwest of Stroitel (the district's administrative centre) by road. Olkhovka is the nearest rural locality.

References 

Rural localities in Yakovlevsky District, Belgorod Oblast
Oboyansky Uyezd